Necdet Ayaz (born 4 July 1958) is a Turkish long-distance runner. He competed in the men's 5000 metres at the 1984 Summer Olympics.

References

1958 births
Living people
Athletes (track and field) at the 1984 Summer Olympics
Turkish male long-distance runners
Olympic athletes of Turkey
Athletes (track and field) at the 1983 Mediterranean Games
Athletes (track and field) at the 1979 Mediterranean Games
People from Elazığ
Mediterranean Games competitors for Turkey